Paul Carrack discography chronicles the list of releases by English musician Paul Carrack.

Albums

Solo albums

1980 Nightbird
1982 Suburban Voodoo (US #78, AUS #93)
1987 One Good Reason (US #67, AUS #46)
1989 Groove Approved (US #120, AUS #116)
1996 Blue Views (UK #55, AUS #247)
1997 Beautiful World (UK #88)
2000 Satisfy My Soul (UK #63)
2001 Groovin'
2003 It Ain't Over (UK #193)
2005 Winter Wonderland (a.k.a. A Soulful Christmas)
2007 Old, New, Borrowed, and Blue
2008 I Know That Name (UK #152)
2010 A Different Hat (UK #152) - [with The Royal Philharmonic Orchestra]
2012 Good Feeling (UK #46)
2013 Rain or Shine (UK #76)
2016 Soul Shadows (UK #25)
2018 These Days (UK #33)
2021 One on One

Live albums
2004 Live At The Opera House
2005 Live in Liverpool
2009 I Know That Name - Live In Concert
2016 Paul Carrack Live at the London Palladium
2020 Paul Carrack Live: The Independent Years, Vol. 1 (2000 - 2020)
2020 Paul Carrack Live: The Independent Years, Vol. 2 (2000 - 2020)
2020 Paul Carrack Live: The Independent Years, Vol. 3 (2000 - 2020)
2020 Paul Carrack Live: The Independent Years, Vol. 4 (2000 - 2020)
2020 Paul Carrack Live: The Independent Years, Vol. 5 (2000 - 2020)

Compilations
1987 Ace Mechanic
1988 The Carrack Collection
1994 Twenty-One Good Reasons: The Paul Carrack Collection
1995 Carrackter Reference
2002 Still Groovin'  (a reissue of 2001's Groovin''', with bonus tracks)
2006 Greatest Hits - The Story So Far - (UK #146)
2012 Collected2014 The Best Of - (UK #35)
2019 Love Songs, Vol. 12019 Love Songs, Vol. 2DVD releases
2000 In Concert2004 Live at the Opera House2005 Live at Shepherds Bush London - [Mike + the Mechanics + Paul Carrack]
2005 Live in Liverpool2007 Live at Rockpalast2009 I Know That Name, In Concert2011 A Different Hat Live''

Singles

Solo

Mike + The Mechanics singles

Ace - Squeeze - Spin 1ne 2wo Singles

Other recordings

Other appearances

External links

Paul Carrack Singles Discography

References

Discographies of British artists
Pop music discographies